Nicolae Bonciocat (13 April 1898 – 22 March 1967) was a Romanian footballer. He competed in the men's tournament at the 1924 Summer Olympics.

References

External links

1898 births
1967 deaths
Romanian footballers
Romania international footballers
Olympic footballers of Romania
Footballers at the 1924 Summer Olympics
Liga I players
Victoria Cluj players
FC Universitatea Cluj players
Place of birth missing
Association football forwards